The Homorodul Nou is a left tributary of the river Someș in Romania. It discharges into the Someș in Ambud, east of the town Satu Mare.

References

Rivers of Romania
Rivers of Satu Mare County